Phenylacetaldehyde is an organic compound used in the synthesis of fragrances and polymers. Phenylacetaldehyde is an aldehyde that consists of acetaldehyde bearing a phenyl substituent; the parent member of the phenylacetaldehyde class of compounds. It has a role as a human metabolite, a Saccharomyces cerevisiae metabolite, an Escherichia coli metabolite and a mouse metabolite. It is an alpha-CH2-containing aldehyde and a member of phenylacetaldehydes.

Phenylacetaldehyde is one important oxidation-related aldehyde. Exposure to styrene gives phenylacetaldehyde as a secondary metabolite. Styrene has been implicated as reproductive toxicant, neurotoxicant, or carcinogen in vivo or in vitro. Phenylacetaldehyde could be formed by diverse thermal reactions during the cooking process together with C8 compounds is identified as a major aroma–active compound in cooked pine mushroom. Phenylacetaldehyde is readily oxidized to phenylacetic acid. Therefore will eventually be hydrolyzed and oxidized to yield phenylacetic acid that will be excreted primarily in the urine in conjugated form.

Natural occurrence
Phenylacetaldehyde occurs extensively in nature because it can be biosynthetically derived from the amino acid phenylalanine. Natural sources of the compound include chocolate, buckwheat, flowers, and communication pheromones from various insect orders. It is notable for being a floral attractant for numerous species of Lepidoptera; for example, it is the strongest floral attractor for the cabbage looper moth.

Uses

Fragrances and flavors
The aroma of pure substance can be described as honey-like, sweet, rose, green, grassy and is added to fragrances to impart hyacinth, narcissi, or rose nuances. For similar reasons the compound can sometimes be found in flavored cigarettes and beverages.

Historically, before biotechnology approaches were developed, phenylacetaldehyde was also used to produce phenylalanine via the Strecker reaction as a step in the production of aspartame sweetener.

Polymers
Phenylacetaldehyde is used in the synthesis of polyesters where it serves as a rate-controlling additive during polymerization.

Natural Medicine
Phenylacetaldehyde is responsible for the antibiotic activity of maggot therapy.

MAOI
Theoretically, hydrazone formation and subsequent reduction of the phenylethylidenehydrazine gives phenelzine.

Preparation
Phenylacetaldehyde can be obtained via various synthetic routes and precursors. Notable examples include:
 Isomerization of styrene oxide.
 Dehydrogenation of 2-Phenylethanol over silver or gold catalysts.
 Darzens reaction between benzaldehyde and chloroacetate esters.
 Wacker oxidation of styrene.
 Hofmann rearrangement of Cinnamamide (aka (2E)-3-Phenylacrylamide).
 Oxidation of Cyclooctatetraene with aqueous Mercury(II) sulfate.
 Strecker degradation of phenylalanine.

Reactivity
Phenylacetaldehyde is often contaminated with polystyrene oxide polymer because of the especial lability of the benzylic alpha proton and the reactivity of the aldehyde. Aldol condensation of the initial dimer gives rise to a range of Michael acceptors and donors.

References 

Insect pheromones
Aldehydes
Phenyl compounds